is a female Japanese novelist. The pen name Asato Asato is a combination of her real name (Toru Asakura) and eighty-eight.

Career 
Asato started writing novels just before she entered junior high school. 

She initially submitted her work to the Kadokawa Beans Bunko Rookie Award, but when in 2014 her manuscript made it to the third round of the 2014 21st Dengeki Novel Prize, Asato started thinking about writing a novel that was "Dengeki Novel-esque." This novel would become the start of the 86 -Eighty Six- series.

In 2016, 86 -Eighty Six- won the 23rd Dengeki Novel Prize.

Bibliography 
86 -Eighty Six- series (86-エイティシックス-) (Illustrated by Shirabii, published by Dengeki Bunko, 12 volumes, 1 of them not yet translated to English)

References

External links 
 

Living people
1985 births
Japanese women novelists
Light novelists
21st-century pseudonymous writers
Pseudonymous women writers